Aptowitzer is a surname. Notable people with the surname include:

 Avigdor Aptowitzer (1871–1942), rabbinic and talmudic scholar